Ben Buie (717 m) is a mountain in the south of the Isle of Mull, Scotland.

A rocky mountain, it has steep and rugged slopes, especially on its eastern face.

References

Mountains and hills of Argyll and Bute
Mountains and hills of the Scottish islands
Marilyns of Scotland
Grahams
Landforms of the Isle of Mull